Suhaimi Hassan (died April 29, 2013) was a Malaysian politician of the Parti Keadilan Rakyat.

Death
On April 29, 2013, he died of a heart attack while driving his car.

References

2013 deaths
People's Justice Party (Malaysia) politicians
Year of birth missing